The Mellor Sigma is a bus manufactured by Mellor Coachcraft since 2021. It is available in various lengths, from 6.99 – 11.97 metres, with the shortest being marketed as the Mellor Sigma 7, and the longest as the Mellor Sigma 12.

The Sigma was created as a zero-emission single deck vehicle, marketed as improving "demand for cleaner solutions to public transport". Mellor claim that there is a weight saving across all models compared to competitor vehicles, with capacities between 30 and 80 passengers depending on the vehicle size.

Mellor initially launched the Sigma with the Sigma 7 and Sigma 10 models, with the Sigma 7 being a single door model and the Sigma 10 being a dual door model. The Sigma 7 debuted at ITT Hub.

Operators

United Kingdom
The first Sigma 7 went to the Holkham Estate in Wells-next-the-Sea, for a bus service to replace the former Wells Harbour Railway, while the first Sigma 12s were ordered by Whippet Coaches for delivery in July 2023, where nine will be used on the company's Universal network serving the University of Cambridge.

The Sigma range has proved popular with some county councils across the United Kingdom, with some specifying Sigmas built on a high-floor platform. Orders across the range have been placed by the Dumfries and Galloway Council, the East Riding of Yorkshire Council and the Islington London Borough Council. Smaller orders have been received from operators London Hire and Shuttlebus, as well as Pinewood Holiday Parks.

Mainland Europe
The first Sigma for mainland Europe were ordered by Swedish operator Nobina for Gothenburg contract city services on behalf of the Västtrafic regional transport authority, with seven Sigma 7s destined for operation on Nobina's route T22 in the city's Angered and Bergsjön districts. 42 more Sigma 7s were ordered for Gothenburg demand-responsive transport services operated by Connect Bus in February 2023.

In Germany, three Sigma 7s are to be delivered to the city of Kiel's municipal bus operator  in March 2023.

Gallery

See also 
Alexander Dennis Enviro200 MMC
Optare Solo SR

References

External Links
 Mellor Coachcraft

Mellor Coachcraft
Minibuses
Battery electric buses
Vehicles introduced in 2021